"Onion Skin" is a song by Australian band, Boom Crash Opera. The song was released in June 1989 as the lead single from their second studio album, These Here Are Crazy Times! (1989). The song reached number 8 on the Billboard Modern Rock chart.

In the song, the singer tells how he has many layers of skin, like an onion. This is meant in a metaphorical manner.

Track listing
7 inch single
 "Onion Skin" (Peter Farnan) - 3:26
 "Rocks Are in My Head" (Peter Farnan, Peter Maslen, Richard Pleasance, Dale Ryder) - 3:42
12 inch single
 Onion Skin (Extended Mix) (Peter Farnan) - 5:05
 These Here Are Crazy Times (Boom Crash Opera) - 4:08
 Rocks Are in My Head (Peter Farnan, Peter Maslen, Richard Pleasance, Dale Ryder) - 3:42

Charts

Weekly charts

Year-end charts

References

External links 
Boom Crash Opera website

1989 singles
Boom Crash Opera songs
1989 songs
Songs written by Richard Pleasance